Set Sail to Mystery is the fourth studio album by German gothic metal band The Vision Bleak, released on 2 April 2010 through Prophecy Productions. A digipak edition containing seven bonus tracks was also released. It counted with a guest appearance by Niklas Kvarforth of Shining fame.

Track listing

Trivia
 "A Curse of the Grandest Kind" takes its lyrics from an excerpt of Lord Byron's 1817 dramatic poem Manfred.
 "Descend into Maelstrom" references both in its title and lyrics Edgar Allan Poe's short story "A Descent into the Maelström".
 "I Dined with the Swans" was inspired by the life of German serial killer Peter Kürten.
 "A Romance with the Grave" was based upon a poem by Heinrich Heine.
 "Mother Nothingness (The Triumph of Ubbo-Sathla)" references the eponymous deity created by Clark Ashton Smith as a part of the Cthulhu Mythos.
 "The Foul Within" is based upon the 1973 film The Exorcist.
 "He Who Paints the Black of Night" was inspired by Oscar Wilde's novel The Picture of Dorian Gray.
 "By the Misery of Fate He Was Haunted" is an English-language adaptation of Czech black metal band Master's Hammer's song "Já mizérií osudu jsem pronásledován...", originally present on their 1992 album Jilemnický okultista.

Critical reception
Sonic Seducer lauded the album's mix of hardness and atmosphere, and noted the theatrical style that is typical of The Vision Bleak.

Personnel

The Vision Bleak
 Ulf Theodor Schwadorf (Markus Stock) – vocals, guitars, bass, keyboards
 Allen B. Konstanz (Tobias Schönemann) – vocals, drums, keyboards

Guest musicians
 Niklas Kvarforth – vocals (on track 9)
 Thomas Helm – additional tenor vocals
 Sophia Brommer – additional vocals (track 5)

Miscellaneous staff
 Martin Koller – production

References

External links
 The Vision Bleak's official website

The Vision Bleak albums
2010 albums
Cthulhu Mythos music